Fang Zhimin is a Western-style Chinese opera by composer  to a libretto by Feng Baiming and Feng Bilie based on the life of communist martyr Fang Zhimin. It was premiered on 28 September 2015. The opera was the ninth opera commission for the Chinese National Centre for the Performing Arts (NCPA). The NCPA released a making-of DVD featuring the dress rehearsal to the production in 2017. A concert performance at the NCPA in Beijing in December 2015 was conducted by Lü Jia.

References

2015 operas
Chinese western-style operas
Operas based on real people
Operas
Jiangxi in fiction